Akkavak is a village in the Kâhta District, Adıyaman Province, Turkey. The village is populated by Kurds of the Reşwan tribe and had a population of 158 in 2021.

References

Villages in Kâhta District

Kurdish settlements in Adıyaman Province